Collections is a 2006 greatest hits album by Amanda Marshall.

Track listing
"Everybody's Got a Story" (Marshall, Mann, Molecules)
"Dark Horse" (Marshall, McTaggart, Tyson)
"Fall from Grace" (Bullard, Jordan)
"Let It Rain" (Hall)
"Double Agent" (Marshall, Mann, Asher, Molecules)
"Birmingham" (McTaggart, O'Brien, Tyson)
"Sunday Morning After" (Marshall, Mann, Asher, Molecules)
"Sitting on Top of the World" (Marshall)
"Believe in You" (Marshall, Eric Bazilian)
"Beautiful Goodbye" (Tyson, Ward)

2006 greatest hits albums
Amanda Marshall albums
Albums produced by Peter Asher
Albums produced by Don Was
Sony Music Canada compilation albums
Epic Records compilation albums